El Bolsón may refer to:
 El Bolsón, Río Negro, a village in Argentina
 Cerro del Bolsón, a mountain in Argentina

See also
 Bolsón de Mapimí, a river basin in Mexico